Bee on Guard is a 1951 animated short film featuring Donald Duck.  It was released by Walt Disney Productions.

Plot
Donald Duck is tending his garden when he spot bees.  Deciding to raid the hive for honey, he follows them. Unfortunately, there is a bee guarding the hive, so Donald disguises himself as a bee in order to gain access. The hive is inaccurately run by a king bee rather than a queen as in real life.

Voice cast
Clarence Nash as Donald Duck

Home media
The short was released on November 11, 2008 on Walt Disney Treasures: The Chronological Donald, Volume Four: 1951-1961.

References

External links
 
 

1951 short films
1951 animated films
1950s Disney animated short films
Donald Duck short films
Films produced by Walt Disney
1950s English-language films
American animated short films
RKO Pictures short films
RKO Pictures animated short films
Films about ducks
Films directed by Jack Hannah
Films about bees
1950s American films
Films scored by Oliver Wallace